Heroes and Zeroes is a 2012 Nigerian drama film written and directed by Niji Akanni; it stars Nadia Buari, Bimbo Manuel and Olu Jacobs. It premiered on August 31, 2012 at Silverbird Galleria, Lagos. It was nominated in 6 categories at the 9th Africa Movie Academy Awards, winning awards for Best Director, Best Screenplay and Best Editing.

The film tells a story about the relationship between a 45 yr old married film director, Amos (Bimbo Manuel) and a film actress, Tonia (Nadia Buari). Amos, who is having troubles in his marriage seeks to be an international soccer star in the nearest future. His wife, Tinuke (Tina Mba) works in a financial institution and is having difficulty coping with the death of her only child. Amos is opportuned to be a part of a major big budget film  to revive his career. He eventually uses it re-establish himself in the film industry. He is greatly obsessed by Tonia and begins extra-marital affairs with her to the detriment of his wife.

Plot 
The film begins with Amos Ayefele (Bimbo Manuel), a film director, who has lost motivation for his job. Amos is having issues in his marriage as a result of his financial troubles. He is seen directing his attention to unrealistic goals, like believing he can still be an international soccer player despite being in his 40s. After several refusals to accept the role to direct a Nigerian/French collaborative film project, Ayefele took the role, and began auditioning prospective aspiring and established actors. Tonia (Nadia Buari) gets the lead role in the film, after Ayefele developed a liking for her at first sight due to her perceived similarity with a lady he met in Kaduna several years ago. After the two decides to meet to discuss this, Tonia is angered at Ayefele persistence that he had met her in the past.

Ayoade Abba (Akin Lewis) is a conservative investigative journalist, who doesn't believe in the pragmatic approach of his colleagues in getting information. However, one of his reporters, Diba (Gabriel Afolayan) is a young photographer, who goes all the way to report juicy news for the tabloid firm. The sensitive style of reporting by Ayoade led the chief publisher, Chief Ikudabo (Olu Jacobs) to query him on the low returns on the daily sales.   
 
Ayefele became increasingly obsessed with Tonia, who initially didn't reciprocate his feelings. However, in a bid to please her sent his wife away

Cast
Nadia Buari as Tonia Amabibi
Olu Jacobs as Chief Ikudabo
Norbert Young as Nnamdi
Tina Mba as Tinuke Amos Fela
Gabriel Afolayan as Dibu Ijele
Akin Lewis as Ayoade Alba
Bimbo Manuel as Amos Ayefele
Linda Ejiofor as Bisola Amabibi
Adeniyi Johnson as Shehu
Jumoke Odetola

Release
It was premiered in Lagos on August 31, 2012. The American premiere was held shortly afterwards. The film was released in theaters nationwide on September 7, 2012. In 2013, it premiered in the UK on March 15 at Odeon Cinema.

Reception

Critical reception 
It received a 62% rating from Nollywood Reinvented, who noted that despite being a properly done film, it might not be so pleasing to an average Nollywood film watcher, because of it being quite "intellectually-inclined". The Nigeria Voice praised the casting and screenplay, describing the film as "one of the most anticipated in this era of Nollywood". In 2014, it was listed as the 9th best African film by Answers Africa. Owing to its attribution to real events, it was also listed as one of the seven best Nollywood films that are based on true events.

Accolades

References

External links
Official Website
Koga Website

Nigerian romantic drama films
English-language Nigerian films
Best Editing Africa Movie Academy Award winners
Best Screenplay Africa Movie Academy Award winners
2010s English-language films
Nigerian drama films